The Continental R-670 (factory designation W670) was a seven-cylinder four-cycle radial aircraft engine produced by Continental displacing 668 cubic inches (11 litres) and a dry weight of .  Horsepower varied from 210 to 240 at 2,200 rpm. The engine was the successor to Continental's first radial engine, the 170 hp Continental A-70. This engine was used on many aircraft in the 1930s and 1940s. The R-670 was widely used in the PT-17 Stearman primary training aircraft of the U.S. military.

In addition to being used in aircraft, the R-670 was used in a number of light armored vehicles of World War II.

Variants
Data from: Jane's All the World's Aircraft 1938
Variants of the W670 included:
W670-Kcarburetor, 5.4:1 compression, 65 Octane, front exhausts and 
W670-Lcarburetor, 5.4:1 compression, 73 Octane, rear exhausts and 
W670-Mcarburetor, 6.1:1 compression, 80 Octane, front exhausts and 
W670-Ncarburetor, 6.1:1 compression, 80 Octane, rear exhausts and 
W670-K1fuel injection, 5.4:1 compression, 73 Octane, front exhausts and 
W670-L1fuel injection, 5.4:1 compression, 73 Octane, rear exhausts and 
W670-M1fuel injection, 6.1:1 compression, 80 Octane, front exhausts and 
W670-N1fuel injection, 6.1:1 compression, 80 Octane, rear exhausts and

Applications

Aircraft
 American Airmotive NA-75
 Boeing-Stearman Model 75 (PT-17, N2S)
 CallAir Model A
 Cessna 190
 Eagle Aircraft Eagle 220
 Fairchild PT-23
 Funk F-23
 G class blimp
 Grumman G-164 Ag Cat
 Kellett K-2A, K-4
 Morane-Saulnier MS.317
 Timm N2T Tutor
 Waco 240-A
 Waco Standard Cabin series (UEC, UIC, UKC, UKC-S, UKS, VKS)
 Waco Custom Cabin series (UOC, VQC)
 Waco A series (UBA, ULA)
 Waco F series (UBF, UMF, UPF)

Armored fighting vehicles
 T2 Combat Car
 T4 Combat Car
 M1 Combat Car
 M2 Light Tank
 M3 Stuart
 Landing Vehicle Tracked (LVT-2, -4; LVT(A)-1, -2, -4, -5)

Specifications (R-670-K)

See also

References

Notes

Bibliography

 Gunston, Bill. World Encyclopaedia of Aero Engines. Cambridge, England. Patrick Stephens Limited, 1989. 
 Jane's Fighting Aircraft of World War II. London. Studio Editions Ltd, 1998.

External links

 https://web.archive.org/web/20070807212519/http://www.oldengine.org/members/diesel/Duxford/usaero1.htm

1930s aircraft piston engines
Aircraft air-cooled radial piston engines
R-670